Wayne James Bennett AM (born 1 January 1950), also known by the nickname "Benny", is an Australian professional rugby league coach who was signed in late 2021 for three years by the Dolphins in readiness and preparation for their inaugural 2023 season in the National Rugby League competition. He was previously the head coach of the South Sydney Rabbitohs among other clubs, and a former rugby league footballer.

Widely regarded as one of the sport's greatest ever coaches, Bennett holds Australian rugby league coaching records for the most (7) grand final wins and most seasons with a single club (24 with the Brisbane Broncos). He has also been head coach of Australia in 1998 and from 2004-2005, assistant head coach of New Zealand in 2008, and head coach of Great Britain/England from 2016-2020. As a coach, Bennett won the Brisbane Rugby League premiership with Souths Logan Magpies. In the 1980s, he earned selection as Queensland's State of Origin coach. After starting his NSWRL Premiership coaching career with the Canberra Raiders, Bennett was appointed as inaugural coach of the Brisbane Broncos in 1988 and later won six premierships with them. Since then, he has coached the St. George Illawarra Dragons with whom he won the 2010 NRL Premiership, the Newcastle Knights and the South Sydney Rabbitohs.

As a player, Bennett was an Australian international and Queensland interstate representative winger or fullback of the 1970s. Before becoming a coach, he worked as a Queensland Police officer.

Early life
Bennett was born in the small township of Allora, Queensland, Australia. He grew up in a working-class family in nearby Warwick with an alcoholic father who deserted the family when Wayne was eleven years old, resulting in him entering the workforce at an early age. He has two sisters, Michelle and Gretta and two brothers, Robert and Dwight. Possibly because of his upbringing, Bennett is an avowed non-smoker, non-drinker and non-gambler. Before becoming involved with the Queensland Rugby League on a full-time basis, Bennett commenced work as a police officer at age 15 while playing junior rugby league in Warwick. His family already had ties to the police and rugby league in South East Queensland through his uncle, 1948 Kangaroo forward Eddie Brosnan.

Playing career
From 1970, Bennett played football for Warwick, and also in the Brisbane Rugby League premiership (BRL) for Past Brothers, Ipswich and Souths. He was a talented  and goal-kicker, and represented Queensland 9 times between 1971 and 1973, including 7 games against New South Wales. Coached by Bob Bax, Bennett credits him as being a major influence in his own later coaching career. Bennett also played two tour matches for Australia on the 1971 tour of New Zealand. In 1972, Bennett played for Toowoomba in the last Bulimba Cup Final against Brisbane. After that, he played for Huddersfield in England alongside fellow Queenslander and future brother-in-law Greg Veivers. Bennett played for Brisbane's Brothers club and under coach Paul Broughton reached the 1974 Grand Final which they lost to Fortitude Valley.

Coaching career

Early years
Bennett began coaching in Ipswich in 1976, before moving to Brisbane Rugby League Premiership sides, Souths and Brothers. 
1975-77 Wayne coached U18 s Qld Police Academy in Brisbane local Comp and the Police Academy Cadet Team V's NSW Police Academy.
After the births of his three children, Bennett had a break from coaching. He returned in 1983 as coach of Souths Acacia Ridge under 16s as well as the Queensland Police Academy under 18s team which he took to a premiership. He also worked as the Police Academy's fitness instructor. Bennett then took over the Souths job and took them to the 1984 grand final, which they lost to the Wynnum-Manly Seagulls. Revenge was to come a year later when the Bennett-coached Magpies defeated the Seagulls 10–8 in the BRL grand final to take the premiership. This was against a Seagulls line-up featuring Australian captain Wally Lewis and centre Gene Miles, both of whom would later captain the Brisbane Broncos under Bennett.

In 1986, Bennett took over from Des Morris as coach of the Queensland State of Origin team. The Maroons were beaten 3–0 in a series whitewash that year; however, Bennett was retained as Queensland's coach for two more years.

In 1987, Bennett moved interstate to join the NSWRL's Winfield Cup Premiership when he was appointed co-coach of the Canberra Raiders alongside then Australian team coach Don Furner. With the Queensland side, Bennett won the 1987 State of Origin series. By the end of the 1987 NSWRL season, he and Furner had guided the Raiders to their first Grand Final which was lost to the Manly-Warringah Sea Eagles 18–8.

Brisbane Broncos
Bennett was appointed to be the first coach of the Brisbane Broncos when the club was formed in 1988. That season with the Maroons, he defeated New South Wales in a 3 nil whitewash in the State of Origin, but Bennett discontinued his representative coaching to focus on the Broncos.

Bennett's reputation for being able to make tough and even unpopular decisions was characterised by his sacking of Wally Lewis as club captain in 1990. At the end of the season, Lewis was not made an offer large enough to retain him, with Bennett citing salary cap restrictions and the need to keep Sydney clubs away from more junior talent coming through. The Broncos won their first premierships in 1992 under Bennett. In the weeks following the grand final, Bennett travelled with the Broncos to England, where they played the 1992 World Club Challenge against British champions Wigan, helping Brisbane become the first NSWRL club to win the match in Britain. The following season, the Broncos again won the grand final, gaining a second consecutive premiership. During the 1994 QLDRL season, Bennett coached defending premiers Brisbane when they unsuccessfully hosted British champions Wigan for the 1994 World Club Challenge.

Bennett was appointed as Queensland coach again for the 1995 State of Origin series but pulled out of the position after players aligned with the breakaway Super League organisation (including the majority of his club team, the Brisbane Broncos) were refused selection. In the 1997 Super League season, the Broncos dominated under Bennett, winning the 1997 World Club Championship as well as the Telstra Cup grand final in Brisbane. Bennett resumed representative coaching duties in 1998 with Queensland and was also given the honour of coaching Australia when he was appointed to replace Bob Fulton as Kangaroos coach. Australia was undefeated in two test matches against New Zealand. Bennett won his fourth premiership with the Broncos when they took the 1998 NRL grand final, and he was also named Coach of the Year at the Queensland Sport Awards. Bennett ceased coaching the Australian national team in March 1999, and was replaced by Chris Anderson.

In 2000, Bennett won his fifth premiership with the Broncos. Following the premiership win, the Australian Rugby Union tried to poach Bennett, but he declined. Having won the 2000 NRL Premiership, the Broncos travelled to England to play against 2000's Super League V Champions, St Helens R.F.C. for the 2001 World Club Challenge, with Bennett overseeing Brisbane's loss. Bennett would again coach Queensland in 2001, gaining widespread attention after his decision to recall Allan Langer to the Maroons from the Super League for the deciding third game of the 2001 State of Origin series. Bennett remained Queensland's coach for the 2002 and 2003 series before stepping down again. He continued his involvement with coaching for Queensland through the Queensland Academy of Sport and in an off-field role with the Queensland Rugby League. On Australia Day 2004, Bennett was honoured as a member of the Order of Australia "for service to rugby league football, particularly as a coach, and to the community."

 Bennett is a passionate advocate of international Rugby League and was instrumental in the revival of the Tri-Nations series in 2004. In that year, he was again appointed Australian coach and took Australia to reclaim the Trans-Tasman Trophy (lost to New Zealand in 2003) and win the second Rugby League Tri-Nations Series. At the end of the 2005 season, after five successive years without a grand final appearance, Bennett decided to have a clean-out of the coaching staff, removing such long-time allies as Gary Belcher, Glenn Lazarus and Kevin Walters. That year, he received the Rugby League International Federation's coach of the year award. However, on 9 December 2005, it was announced that Bennett had resigned as Australia's coach after the Kangaroos lost an international series for the first time in 27 years, and equalled their biggest loss in 98 years, going down 24–0 to New Zealand in the final of the 2005 Tri-nations series. In 2006 a secret deal being brokered between Bennett and the Sydney Roosters club for him to become their coach was made public. This is said to have caused the deterioration in his relationship with the Broncos management which eventually led to his resignation. During the 2006 finals series, Bennett became the second person (after Tim Sheens) to coach 500 premiership games. He also signed on to continue coaching the Broncos for a further two years. The sixth premiership final won by Brisbane against Melbourne made Wayne Bennett the most successful Grand Final coach in history. He again was named Queensland's Sport Coach of the Year for 2007 and was made a life member of the Broncos club. His refusal to make an acceptance speech at the club's presentation ball showed the strain in his relationship with the Broncos. Bennett coached the 2007 All Golds. In doing so, he introduced the New Zealand players to the Queen and the Duke of Edinburgh.

Bennett was originally contracted to the Broncos until the end of 2009 , but on the night of 4 February 2008 at a Broncos board meeting, he submitted his letter of resignation and sought an early release at the end of the 2008 season. Bennett's coaching future was confirmed on 31 March 2008, when he signed a three-year contract to coach the St. George Illawarra Dragons from season 2009. After much speculation, Bennett became assistant coach and advisor to New Zealand coach Stephen Kearney in 2008. This was in preparation for the Centenary test against the Kangaroos. Bennett was retained in the same role for the 2008 Rugby League World Cup, which the Kiwis won. Former New Zealand coach Graham Lowe has credited Bennett with the victory.

St George Illawarra Dragons
The Bennett era at St George Illawarra began with high turnover of staff and players. High performance director Jeremy Hickmans, conditioner Scott Campbell and manager/assistant Paul Massey were recruited to replace the existing staff, while the playing roster had recently lost high-profile stars Mark Gasnier to retirement with Jason Ryles and Josh Morris released. The club's player recruiting however was extensive: Jeremy Smith, Darius Boyd, Neville Costigan, Luke Priddis, Michael Weyman, Mathew Head (returned) and Mickey Paea. At the Dragons, Bennett was to be re-united with former Broncos Wendell Sailor and Luke Priddis, both of whom had won premierships with him at Brisbane. Neville Costigan, who also played under Bennett at the Broncos joined the Dragons that year in addition to Darius Boyd and Nick Emmett who also moved from Brisbane to St. George Illawarra at the same time as Bennett.

His first game with the Dragons was a golden point loss to the previous season's grand finalists, Melbourne Storm. In round 4 of the 2009 NRL season, Bennett returned to Suncorp Stadium with the Dragons and for the first time coached against the club he helped build. St. George Illawarra defeated the Broncos convincingly as the Dragons continued to lead the competition in defence. However, after winning the minor premiership in his first season at the club, it was the Brisbane Broncos who knocked the Dragons out of finals contention at the end of the 2009 season.

In 2009, Bennett was inducted into the Queensland Sport Hall of Fame.

In the 2010 NRL season, Bennett guided the Dragons to their second consecutive minor premiership and on to the 2010 NRL Grand Final, the joint venture club's second. After years of having a "choker" tag, they faced the Sydney Roosters at ANZ Stadium in the decider at the season's end. The rain fell across the ground during the match and Bennett's players had a fiery 2nd Half after a traditional spray at half time as they were being led 8–6 at the break. The Dragons under Bennett were successful in winning their first premiership as a joint venture who went on to beat the Roosters 32–8.

The Dragons went on to defeat 2010's Super League XV champions, Wigan Warriors in the 2011 World Club Challenge, but Bennett was absent, choosing to fly back to Australia days before the match to be with his ill mother-in-law, and leaving assistant coach Steve Price in charge.

On 30 March 2011, Bennett announced he would not continue on as coach of St George Illawarra beyond the 2011 season. His final game at the helm of St. George Illawarra ended the way it started, with a heartbreaking golden point loss against his old club, the Brisbane Broncos, at Suncorp Stadium. This extended Bennett's winless finals record at the venue to eight.

Newcastle Knights

On 12 April 2011, Bennett announced that he would be joining Nathan Tinkler's newly acquired Newcastle Knights in 2012 on a 4-year deal. Darius Boyd again followed Bennett to his new club, moving with him to Newcastle as he had when the pair moved from Brisbane to St George Illawarra. During the 2012 Newcastle Knights season, he was credited with the resurgence in Willie Mason's career after Bennett had agreed to sign the 31-year-old after an aborted attempt at a rugby union career in France. The Knights failed to make the finals in the 2012 season, the first finals series not to feature Bennett in 21 years.

For the 2013 Newcastle Knights season, Bennett took the club within one match of the 2013 NRL Grand Final. Part-way through the 2014 Newcastle Knights season, during which the club's relationship with Nathan Tinkler ended, Bennett announced that he would be leaving the club at the end of the season, one year earlier than contracted, to return to the Brisbane Broncos ahead of the 2015 season.

Return to the Brisbane Broncos
Bennett returned to coach the Brisbane Broncos for the 2015 NRL season, with Darius Boyd once again following Bennett back to his original club. The Broncos subsequently finished 2nd in the regular season and made it to the grand final, only to lose 17-16 to the North Queensland Cowboys in golden point extra time, which was the Broncos first grand final defeat. Bennett continued with the Broncos until the end of the 2018 season.

On 2 December 2018, Bennett was officially sacked as coach of the Brisbane Broncos following a bitter dispute with Broncos officials. He was then signed up to coach the South Sydney Rabbitohs for the 2019 season and beyond. On 4 December 2018, Bennett spoke to the media about his sacking saying "You don’t get the chance to say goodbye to anybody when they sack you and they tell you not to come back to the building", Bennett said. "But that’s alright. That’s all fine. We’ll all get over it. I was happy to be sacked. Just leave it at that. I was happy".

Great Britain and England
In 2016, Bennett was appointed coach of England for two seasons. The decision however suffered criticism from some critics, such as former English internationals Kevin Sinfield and Jamie Peacock who believe previous coach Steve McNamara should have stayed at the helm, while Australian rugby league legend Wally Lewis said that an Australian should not be coaching the English team. Later in 2016, rumours came about that Wayne would be selecting Australian players such as Brett and twin brother Josh Morris as well as Trent Hodkinson in his English team for the 2016 Four Nations. However, he 'denied' that he'd select those players in his squad saying that the media is 'getting excited'. In October 2017, Bennett was selected for the England squad in the 2017 Rugby League World Cup.

In 2019, Bennett was selected as head coach for the Great Britain Lions tour of the Southern Hemisphere. He took charge of Great Britain for the first time in the defeat by Tonga.
Great Britain ended the tour losing all four matches including the last match which was a humiliating 28-10 loss against Papua New Guinea in Port Moresby.  Following the conclusion of the tour, several Great Britain players and Bennett himself came under intense media scrutiny and fan backlash.

He was also selected to coach the England 9s squad for the 2019 Rugby League World Cup 9s.

South Sydney Rabbitohs
In 2019, Bennett started his first of three seasons as South Sydney coach with the club winning 10 of their first 11 games which saw them sitting at the top of the table.  Following the 2019 State of Origin series, Souths suffered a slump in form before winning their last 3 matches in a row to finish the regular season in 3rd place. Bennett guided South Sydney to the preliminary final against the Canberra Raiders but were defeated 16-10 at Canberra Stadium.

On 21 February 2020, it was announced that Bennett would be leaving South Sydney as head coach at the end of the 2021 season with assistant Jason Demetriou taking his place. Nevertheless, Bennett guided South Sydney to a sixth place finish in the 2020 NRL season which saw the club qualify for the finals. Bennett took South Sydney to their third preliminary final in a row where they suffered a 20-16 loss against Penrith. On 14 January 2021, it was announced that Bennett relinquished his Queensland Maroons coaching job from the previous year. In the 2021 NRL season, Bennett guided South Sydney to a third placed finish. He then took South Sydney to the 2021 NRL Grand Final which was also Bennett's tenth grand final as a head coach. South Sydney would go on to lose the final narrowly to Penrith 14-12.

Dolphins
Commencing in 2022, Bennett joined the Dolphins as head coach for their inaugural 2023 season in the NRL competition.

Public persona
Bennett is known for a number of distinctive behaviours that have earned him the nickname "Skeletor" and have occasionally been the subject of both positive and negative media attention. These include his taciturn nature and reputation for rarely smiling and appearing outwardly unemotional. Television coverage of NRL matches typically show footage of the coach's box at crucial points with the coaches often reflecting the on-field mood. However, Bennett is usually stern and intensely focused on the game.

Bennett has stated that he detests the media commitments required as head coach of a high-profile football team. Although on occasions he will happily give in-depth interviews, he has also been known to act with hostility towards the press, avoiding questions, starting press conferences early and at times refusing to answer.

Personal life
Bennett's brother Bob Bennett has also coached rugby league at international level with the Papua New Guinea team.

With journalist Steve Crawley, Wayne Bennett wrote Don't Die with the Music in You whose title refers to a quote from the American intellectual Oliver Wendell Holmes, Sr. regarding failure to meet one's potential. The likes of Steve Waugh, Lachlan Murdoch, David Gallop, John Singleton and Jack Gibson attended the book's launch at the Australian Museum in Sydney on 7 May 2002. It went on to sell over 100,000 copies. Bennett has also written a weekly column in The Australian. His second book, The Man in the Mirror was released in November 2008, soon after the New Zealand Kiwis' World Cup victory.

Bennett married Trish Bennett in 1974. They separated in 2016.

In 2016, Bennett commenced a relationship with Dale Cage, who he met while coaching in Newcastle.

Recognition
1994: Medal of the Order of Australia "in recognition of service to the sport of Rugby League, particularly as coach of the Brisbane Broncos"
 1997: Super League Coach of the Year
 1998: Queensland Father of the year
 2000: NRL Coach of the Year
2000: Australian Sports Medal for "significant contribution to the development of sport"
2004: Member of the Order of Australia for "service to Rugby League football, particularly as a coach, and to the community"
2012: Inducted into the Sport Australia Hall of Fame
2015: Dally M Coach of the Year

References

Further reading

External links

South Sydney Rabbitohs profile

Man for All Seasons – Australian Story Transcript
Wayne Bennett at celebrityspeakers.com.au

Wayne Bennett at icmi.com.au
 

 

 

1950 births
Living people
Australia national rugby league team coaches
Australia national rugby league team players
Australian police officers
Australian rugby league coaches
Australian rugby league players
Australian expatriate sportspeople in England
Brisbane Broncos coaches
Canberra Raiders coaches
England national rugby league team coaches
Great Britain national rugby league team coaches
Huddersfield Giants players
Members of the Order of Australia
Newcastle Knights coaches
People from the Darling Downs
Q150 Icons
Queensland Greats
Queensland Rugby League State of Origin coaches
Queensland rugby league team players
Recipients of the Australian Sports Medal
Recipients of the Medal of the Order of Australia
Rugby league fullbacks
Rugby league players from Queensland
Rugby league wingers
Souths Logan Magpies players
Sport Australia Hall of Fame inductees
St. George Illawarra Dragons coaches
Wayne